Bogdan III the One-Eyed or Bogdan III the Blind (March 18, 1479 – April 20, 1517) was Voivode of Moldavia from July 2, 1504, to 1517.

Family
Bogdan was born in Huşi as the son of Voivode Ştefan cel Mare (Stephen the Great) and his wife Maria Voichița. He was his father's only surviving legitimate son.

Conflict with Poland and Tatar incursions
Immediately after Bogdan came to the throne, he expressed his intent to marry Elisabeth, sister of Polish King Alexander the Jagiellonian. After being twice refused despite offering generous gifts (including territorial concessions), he raided southern Poland, and Alexander accepted his demands—provided that Bogdan be more lenient towards the status of the Roman Catholic Church in Moldavia—in 1506. Alexander's death and Sigismund the Old's ascendancy led to a breaking of the previous agreement, provoking further incursions on each side. In October 1509, Bogdan was severely defeated on the Dniester river; a peace was signed on January 17, 1510, when the ruler finally renounced his pretensions.

In the same year, Moldavia suffered two major Tatar devastations (they are alleged to have carried away 74,000 as slaves) — in 1511, the Tatars even managed to occupy most of the country. The events forced Poland, still recovering from the great invasion of 1506 (see Tatar invasions), to send troops as aid, helping Bogdan regain his lands after a victory in May 1512.

Submission to Ottoman rule
In 1514, in order to block the Tatar threat by enlisting the help of a powerful overlord, Bogdan sent chancellor Tăutu to negotiate the terms of Moldavia's submission to the Ottoman Empire (then under the rule of Yavuz Sultan Selim, or Selim I).

The Porte demanded that a certain sum (initially expressed as 4,000 gold coins) be paid yearly, together with a ceremonial gift of 40 horses and 40 falcons, additional expenses (such as for the celebration of Eid ul-Fitr) and assistance in case of war — Princes themselves were required to lead a 4,000-strong army that would place itself under the orders of the Sultan. In exchange for these, Moldavia was allowed a high level of autonomy.

Life
Bogdan was blind in one eye, most likely after a wound received during one of his many battles. While the rules of succession to the throne did exclude an impaired individual, as însemnat ("marked"), they seem to have applied just to people who had been affected before their candidacy to the throne, and to those with congenital disorders.

He was married to Stana, Nastasia and finally to Ruxandra, daughter of Wallachian Prince Mihnea cel Rău.

He was buried next to his father (and other members of his family) in Putna Monastery.

See also

External links
Putna Monastery

1470s births
1517 deaths
15th-century Romanian people
16th-century Romanian people
Romanian blind people
Blind royalty and nobility
Burials at Putna Monastery
House of Bogdan-Mușat
Rulers of Moldavia
Stephen the Great